The Queen's Medal for Champion Shots of the Air Forces was instituted in 1953, as an Air Force version of the Queen's Medal for Champion Shots in the Military Forces. One medal each can be awarded to the champion shot of annual small arms marksmanship competitions held by the Air Forces of the United Kingdom and those member countries of the British Commonwealth whose Governments desire to take part in the grant of the award.

The Air Forces of countries that took part at some stage include the United Kingdom's Royal Air Force, the Royal Australian Air Force, the Royal Canadian Air Force, the Royal New Zealand Air Force and the Royal Rhodesian Air Force. Today, only the United Kingdom and New Zealand still award the medal.

Origin
The Medal for the Best Shot in the British Army, Infantry, was instituted by Queen Victoria in 1869 and was awarded from 1870 to 1882 to the best shot of the annual Army shooting competition. In 1923 the medal was re-introduced by King George V and designated the King's Medal for Champion Shots in the Military Forces. It could now be awarded to the champions of Army marksmanship competitions, held under battle conditions, at annual central meetings in the United Kingdom, the British Dominions, Colonies and India.

All contenders for the King's/Queen's Medal for Champion Shots in the Military Forces have to be actual serving members of the Regular Army, Army Emergency Reserve, Territorial Army, or Local Militia and Volunteer Forces in the countries concerned. Members of independent Naval and Air Forces, while not excluded from the competition, could therefore not be awarded the medal even though they won the championship. This happened to an Air Force shot twice, in Canada in 1938 and in Rhodesia in 1962.

Institution

The Queen's Medal for Champion Shots of the Air Forces was instituted by Queen Elizabeth II on 12 June 1953. Only one medal, or a clasp only, is granted annually in each of the Air Forces of the United Kingdom and those member countries of the British Commonwealth whose governments desire to take part in the grant of the award. Apart from the United Kingdom, the Dominions of Australia, Canada and New Zealand and the Colony of Rhodesia all took part at some stage, but only the United Kingdom and New Zealand still award the medal.

Every medal is awarded with a clasp, inscribed with the year of award and attached to the medal's suspension bar. Holders of the medal who qualify for a subsequent award, are awarded a clasp only, to be worn on the ribbon of the original medal and attached to the original or previous clasp. When medals are not worn, the award of second or further clasps are denoted on the ribbon bar by a silver rosette to denote the award of each additional clasp.

Award criteria
The medal is awarded to the champion shot of the annual championship meeting of each respective Air Force, held under service rifle championship conditions. All medal contenders have to be actual serving members of the Regular Air Forces of the respective countries.

Order of wear
In the order of wear prescribed by the British Central Chancery of the Orders of Knighthood, the Queen's Medal for Champion Shots of the Air Forces takes precedence after the Queen's Medal for Champion Shots in the Military Forces and before the Cadet Forces Medal.

Participating countries
The tables below list the known recipients of the medal in the respective participating countries.

United Kingdom
In the United Kingdom, the first Royal Air Force championship to compete for the medal took place in 1953 and was won by Senior Technician J.E.P.P. Witts of RAF Stafford. The championship took place annually since then, except in 1991 when no competition was held as a result of the Gulf War. The record for the most wins of the Air Force medal is held by Chief Technician J.T. Prictor, who won the championship for the fourteenth time in 2009.

Australia
The first Royal Australian Air Force championship to compete for the medal took place in 1956 and the first medal to an Australian was won by Warrant Officer C.E.P. Hawes. The championship took place annually from then until 1987, except in 1963 when no competition was held. In 1988, the Champion Shots Medal was instituted in Australia and the Queen's Medal for Champion Shots of the Air Forces ceased to be awarded.

Canada
The first Royal Canadian Air Force championship to compete for the medal took place in 1954 and the first medal to a Canadian was won by Flight Sergeant J.V.P. Martin CD. The championship took place annually from then until 1967, when the Canadian Army, the Royal Canadian Navy and the Royal Canadian Air Force were unified into the Canadian Armed Forces. As a result, the Queen's Medal for Champion Shots of the Air Forces ceased to be awarded and, from 1968, regular Canadian Air Force members competed with regular Army and Navy members for the Queen's Medal for Champion Shots in the Military Forces.

New Zealand
The first Royal New Zealand Air Force championship to compete for the medal took place in 1954 and the first medal to a New Zealander was won by Warrant Officer F.A. Haycock. The championship, which is restricted to members of the regular Air Force, took place annually from then, except in 1966, 1967, 1996 and from 1998 to 2003, when no competition was held. The medal is still current in New Zealand.

Rhodesia
The 1962 Rhodesian Army competition for the Queen's Medal for Champion Shots in the Military Forces was won by Corporal Technician B.T. Gilpin of Thornhill Air Base, a member of the Royal Rhodesian Air Force. Despite protests from the Army commanders, the Minister of Defence presented Gilpin with the Army medal. As a result of the controversy, Rhodesia sought and was granted the Crown's permission to introduce the Queen's Medal for Champion Shots of the Air Forces. The first Royal Rhodesian Air Force championship to compete for the Air Force medal took place in 1963, but the first medal award was backdated to 1962 and the first two medals were presented in December 1963, one to Gilpin and the other to the Air Force champion for 1963, Flight Lieutenant W.J. Geeringh. Gilpin's 1962 Army medal was returned and the 1962 Army runner-up, Inspector D. Hollingworth, was awarded a second clasp to his existing medal.

The championship took place annually from then until 1968, even after Rhodesia's Unilateral Declaration of Independence on 11 November 1965, until Rhodesia severed its ties with the British Crown on 2 March 1970 and, in that same year, instituted the President's Medal for Shooting of the Security Forces.

Description
The medal was struck in silver and is a disk,  in diameter, with a raised rim on each side and suspended from a straight silver bar.

Obverse
The obverse bears the effigy of Queen Elizabeth II and is circumscribed "ELIZABETH II DEI GRATIA REGINA F. D.", reading around from the top. The effigy was designed by sculptor Cecil Thomas OBE and was used on a number of medals.

Reverse
The reverse shows Hermes, the mythological messenger of the gods, mounted on the back of a hawk in flight, with a javelin in his right hand and in his left a caduceus, two snakes wrapped around a winged staff. The image is circumscribed “THE QUEEN'S MEDAL FOR CHAMPION SHOTS OF THE AIR FORCES”. The reverse of the medal was designed by British sculptor Sir Bernard Sindall.
	
Clasp
Since the medal can be won multiple times, each subsequent award is indicated by the award of another clasp, which displays the year of the subsequent award. The clasps are designed to be attached to the suspender and to each other with rivets, in roller chain fashion. When medals are not worn, the award of second and subsequent clasps are denoted by silver rosettes on the ribbon bar. Since it is impossible to sew more than four rosettes onto a single ribbon bar and since several champions have won the award more than five times, gold rosettes were introduced to provide for situations where more than five championships have been won.

Ribbon
The ribbon is 32 millimetres wide and dark crimson with a 3 millimetres wide dark blue band, a 3 millimetres wide light blue band and a 3 millimetres wide dark blue band on each edge.

References

Decorations of the Royal Air Force
Military awards and decorations of New Zealand